Pilodeudorix violetta, the violet diopetes, is a butterfly in the family Lycaenidae. It is found in Guinea, Sierra Leone, Liberia, Ivory Coast, Ghana, southern Nigeria, Cameroon, Gabon, the Republic of the Congo, the Central African Republic, the Democratic Republic of the Congo (Uele), Uganda and north-western Tanzania.

Adults have been recorded feeding from the flowers of Eupatorium species.

References

Butterflies described in 1897
Deudorigini
Butterflies of Africa
Taxa named by Per Olof Christopher Aurivillius